Tolongoina is a town and commune in Madagascar. It belongs to the district of Ikongo, which is a part of Vatovavy-Fitovinany Region. The population of the commune was estimated to be approximately 17,000 in 2001 commune census.

Primary and junior level secondary education are available in town. The majority 85% of the population of the commune are farmers.  The most important crops are bananas and ginger, while other important agricultural products are coffee and rice. Services provide employment for 15% of the population.

Geography
It lies at the Fianarantsoa-Côte Est railway that links the town with Fianarantsoa and Manakara.

References and notes 

Populated places in Vatovavy-Fitovinany